Three referendums were held in Switzerland in 1982. The first two were held on 6 June on an amendment to the Swiss penal code, which was approved, and on a new law on foreigners, which was narrowly rejected. The last were held on 28 November on a popular initiative "for the prevention of abusive prices", alongside a counter-proposal. The initiative was approved and the counter-proposal rejected.

Results

June: Penal code

June: Foreigner law

November: Prices

References

1982 referendums
1982 in Switzerland
Referendums in Switzerland
June 1982 events in Europe
November 1982 events in Europe